Camilla (minor planet designation: 107 Camilla) is one of the largest asteroids from the outermost edge of the asteroid belt, approximately  in diameter. It is a member of the Sylvia family and located within the Cybele group. It was discovered on 17 November 1868, by English astronomer Norman Pogson at Madras Observatory, India, and named after Camilla, Queen of the Volsci in Roman mythology. The X-type asteroid is a rare trinary asteroid with two minor-planet moons discovered in 2001 and 2016, respectively. It is elongated in shape and has a short rotation period of 4.8 hours.

Physical characteristics 
Camilla has a very dark surface and primitive carbonaceous composition.

A large number of rotational lightcurves of have been obtained from photometric observations since the 1980s. Best rated results gave a short rotation period of 4.844 hours with a brightness amplitude between 0.32 and 0.53 magnitude.

Lightcurve analysis indicates that Camilla's pole most likely points towards ecliptic coordinates (β, λ) = (+51°, 72°) with a 10° uncertainty, which gives it an axial tilt of 29°. Follow-up modeling of photometric data gave similar results.

Diameter and albedo 

10μ radiometric data collected from Kitt Peak in 1975 gave a first diameter estimate of 209 km. According to the space-based surveys carried out by the Japanese Akari satellite, the Infrared Astronomical Satellite IRAS and the NEOWISE mission of NASA's Wide-field Infrared Survey Explorer, as well as observations by the Keck Observatory and photometric modeling, Camilla measures between 185 and 247 kilometers in diameter and its surface has an albedo between 0.160 and 0.294.

Satellites 

Camilla is the 6th trinary asteroid that has been discovered in the asteroid belt, after 87 Sylvia, 45 Eugenia, 216 Kleopatra, 93 Minerva and 130 Elektra (a quaternary).

S1 

On 1 March 2001, a minor-planet moon of Camilla was found by A. Storrs, F. Vilas, R. Landis, E. Wells, C. Woods, B. Zellner, and M. Gaffey using the Hubble Space Telescope. It has been designated  but has not yet received an official name.

Later observations in September 2005 with the Very Large Telescope (VLT) allowed the determination of an orbit. Apart from data in infobox, the inclination was found to be 3 ± 1° with respect to an axis pointing towards (β, λ) = (+55°, 75°). Given the ~10° uncertainty in the actual rotational axis of Camilla, one can say that the orbit's inclination is less than 10°.

The satellite is estimated to measure about 11 km in diameter. Assuming a similar density to the primary, this would give it an approximate mass of ~1.5 kg. It has a similar colour to the primary.

S2  

In 2016, the discovery of a second satellite of Camilla was reported by astronomers at Cerro Paranal's Very Large Telescope in Chile. It has the provisional designation .

Observations were taken between 29 May 2015 and 30 July 2016, using the VLT-SPHERE, the principal instrument attached to the 8-meter "Melipal" (UT3) unit of the VLT. On 3 out of 5 observation sessions, the new satellite could be detected. The body's orbit has a semi-major axis of 340 kilometers.

Notes

References

External links 
 IAU Circulars – 2016: S/2016 (107) 1
 (107) Camilla, S/2001 (107) 1, and S/2016 (107) 1, johnstonsarchive.net
 Hubble Finds New Asteroid Moon (SpaceDaily.com, 21-03-2001), includes discovery image.
 107 Camilla and S/2001 (107) 1, orbit data website maintained by F. Marchis. Includes orbit diagrams.
 
 

000107
000107
Discoveries by N. R. Pogson
Named minor planets
000107
000107
000107
18681117